Jarales is a census-designated place (CDP) in Valencia County, New Mexico, United States. The population was 2,475 at the 2010 census. It is part of the Albuquerque Metropolitan Statistical Area.

Geography
Jarales is located at  (34.599825, -106.767856).

Demographics

As of the census of 2000, there were 1,434 people, 505 households, and 394 families residing in the CDP. The population density was 250.1 people per square mile (96.6/km2). There were 534 housing units at an average density of 93.1 per square mile (36.0/km2). The racial makeup of the CDP was 68.83% White, 0.63% African American, 0.91% Native American, 0.28% Asian, 25.52% from other races, and 3.84% from two or more races. Hispanic or Latino of any race were 64.57% of the population.

There were 505 households, out of which 35.8% had children under the age of 18 living with them, 61.2% were married couples living together, 9.9% had a female householder with no husband present, and 21.8% were non-families. 17.2% of all households were made up of individuals, and 6.3% had someone living alone who was 65 years of age or older. The average household size was 2.84 and the average family size was 3.20.

In the CDP, the population was spread out, with 29.4% under the age of 18, 7.3% from 18 to 24, 29.0% from 25 to 44, 24.5% from 45 to 64, and 9.8% who were 65 years of age or older. The median age was 35 years. For every 100 females, there were 99.2 males. For every 100 females age 18 and over, there were 99.2 males.

The median income for a household in the CDP was $26,897, and the median income for a family was $34,464. Males had a median income of $26,813 versus $15,909 for females. The per capita income for the CDP was $12,561. About 9.5% of families and 13.9% of the population were below the poverty line, including 15.9% of those under age 18 and 15.7% of those age 65 or over.

Education
Its school district is Belén Consolidated Schools. Belén High School is the district's comprehensive high school.

References

Census-designated places in New Mexico
Census-designated places in Valencia County, New Mexico
Albuquerque metropolitan area